Chonopla is a genus of moths in the family Lasiocampidae. The genus was erected by Yves de Lajonquière in 1980.

Species
Chonopla modulata Swinhoe, 1890
Chonopla tecta de Lajonquière, 1979

External links

Lasiocampidae